The fifth season of American Dad! originally aired on the Fox network from September 28, 2008, to May 17, 2009. It consisted of twenty episodes and was released as two DVD box sets and in syndication. American Dad! follows the dysfunctional Smith family—father Stan, mother Francine, daughter Hayley, son Steve, the pet fish Klaus, and extraterrestrial alien Roger, all of whom reside in their hometown of Langley Falls, Virginia. Season 5, which premiered with the episode "1600 Candles" and ended with "Stan's Night Out", was executive produced by David Zuckerman, Kenny Schwartz, Rick Wiener, Richard Appel, Matt Weitzman, Mike Barker, and series creator Seth MacFarlane. Weitzman and Barker served as the season's showrunners.

Season 5 satirized various political and social topics, including incest, the coming out aspect of homosexuality, and appeal to fear propaganda. The season was met with generally positive reception from critics. Some went on to criticize the show for the level of inconsistency. However, the overall development of the show during this season was praised by critics, saying that "the show has grown into its own over the past seasons." The season premiere was nominated for a Primetime Emmy Award for Outstanding Animated Program (for Programming Less Than One Hour) in 2009.

The Volume 4 DVD box set was released in Region 1 on April 28, 2009, Region 2 on April 20, 2009, and Region 4 on November 18, 2009. Six of the 21 episodes are included in the Volume 4 DVD box set. The remaining fourteen episodes of the season were released on the Volume 5 DVD box set, released in Region 1 on June 15, 2010, Region 2 on June 14, 2010, and Region 4 on November 3, 2010.


Production

During Season 4, episodes of American Dad! and its sister show, Family Guy, were delayed from regular broadcast due to the 2007–08 Writers Guild of America strike. Seth MacFarlane, the creator of the series, publicly sided with the Writers Guild, and fully participated in the strike and other events pertaining to the issue. The official production of American Dad! started to dwindle as of February 2008, with a delay in production becoming imminent through much of March and April. The strike ended on February 12, 2008; and the series resumed airing regularly within a few months.

Production for Season 5 began in 2008, during the airing of the Season 4. The season was executive produced by series regulars David Zuckerman, Kenny Schwartz, Rick Wiener, Richard Appel, Matt Weitzman, Mike Barker, and series creator Seth MacFarlane. The showrunners for the season were Weitzman and Barker. As production began Matt Weitzman, Jim Bernstein, Chris and Matt McKenna, Brian Boyle, Erik Sommers, Laura McCreary, Jonathan Fener, Erik Durbin, David Zuckerman and Kenny Schwartz all stayed on from the previous season. Both Matt Fusfeld and Alex Cuthbertson received their first writing credit for the series. Directors Pam Cooke, Josh Aoshima, Tim Parsons, Rodney Clouden, Albert Calleros, Joe Daniello, and Bob Bowen all stayed with the show from the previous season. David Hemingson left the series, and went on to co-direct for other television shows, notably How I Met Your Mother, and went on to create a short-lived television series, entitled The Deep End. Michael Shipley and Dan Vebber also left at the end of the third production season.

The main cast consisted of Seth MacFarlane (Stan Smith, Roger, Greg Corbin, among others), Wendy Schaal (Francine Smith), Rachael MacFarlane (Hayley Smith, among others), Scott Grimes (Steve Smith) and Dee Bradley Baker (Klaus Heissler, among others). Several new characters were created and introduced in Season 5. The character of Sidney—a persona of Roger who escapes to start a life of his own—was introduced in the episode "The One That Got Away". He was voiced by the series creator Seth MacFarlane. Avery Bullock's wife, Mariam, who was kidnapped and held hostage by terrorists for three years, was also introduced and voiced by Jean Smart. Amy, one of Lisa Silver's friends and a frequent bully of Steve, was introduced during this season. Amanda Seyfried provided the voice for the character. J.K. Simmons provided the voice of Mr. McCreary, the founder and chairman of a local Bible print shop, and Reginald the Koala, another "volunteer" from the CIA's secret brain-swap program. He is voiced by Donald Fullilove until midway through next season, where writer Erik Durbin provides the voice. Other guest stars who made multiple appearances as recurring characters from previous seasons were Patrick Stewart as Avery Bullock, Stan's boss at the CIA and Mike Barker as Terry Bates, who briefly returned in the episode "Daddy Queerest".

The opening sequence of the series was revamped. Instead of Stan picking up a newspaper with a different headline on it, there is now a recurring gag of Roger appearing in different disguises from under the dashboard. Stan's interaction with the family and his commute from his house to the CIA have also been modified.

Episode list

Home media
The first six episodes of the fifth season and the last eight episode of the fourth season were released on DVD by 20th Century Fox in the United States and Canada on April 28, 2009, nearly a year after the production of the third season was finished. The "Volume Four" DVD release features bonus material including deleted scenes, animatics, and commentaries for every episode.

The remaining fourteen episodes of the fifth season were released under the title "Volume Five" by 20th Century Fox in the United States and Canada on June 15, 2010, a month after they had completed broadcast on television. The DVD release also features bonus material including deleted scenes, commentaries, and two mini-games.

Reception

The season premiere for the fifth season of American Dad! received 6.89 million viewers upon its initial airing, the second highest viewed episode of the season. The total viewership for the episode significantly increased from the fourth season premiere, which was viewed by 6.07 million viewers upon its original airing. In the weeks following "1600 Candles", the total viewership ratings hovered right under 7 million. The fourth episode of the season, "Choosy Wives Choose Smith", garnered the highest ratings of the season, having been watched by 7.09 million viewers. This would be the highest rated American Dad! episode since the season four episode "Tearjerker", as this episode received 8.62 million viewers upon its initial airing. The ninth episode of the season, "Stan Time", gained the lowest number of viewers of the season with 4.60 million viewers. The average total viewership for the season per episode was 5.5 million viewers, and the season average for ratings in the 18–49 demographic per episode was a 2.9 rating. The average rating increased by 20% from the previous season. However, the average total viewership would decrease by 16% from the previous season.

Reviews for the episodes, as well as the season as a whole, were met with mainly positive reception from critics. In his review for the season, Hunter Daniels of Collider gave it a mixed review. He opined: "American Dad is not a great show. However, it's pretty funny on occasion. This set is about on par with the other seasons and might well be worth a purchase for hardcore fans and completeists. If you think you will like it, you will. If you're on the fence [...] it's probably only a rental." R.L. Shaffer of IGN said that "American Dad comes from the weird and wicked mind of Seth MacFarlane, who brought us the irreverent and often puerile powerhouse Family Guy [...], and like the show[s], American Dad offers a supreme dose of silly mockery that's occasionally offensive [...] and outrageously wacky through-and-through." However, he criticized the show for having similar problem that he thought existed in Family Guy. Shaffer opined: "American Dad suffers from many of the same problems as Family Guy. The show quite often stumbles into territory it's simply not mature enough to handle. And because the show already plays like Family Guy 2.0, the characters and settings aren't quite original enough to keep the material fresh." He gave the release a 6 out of 10, signifying a "passable" score. 

Kevin Stanley of Cinema.com gave the season a very positive review, writing, "Overall American Dad is consistently funny and amusing, it's certainly in my opinion, currently the best animated comedy and has been for some time. It is literally laugh-a-minute stuff, which can't be said for all TV shows, even the one's that do bill themselves as comedy. The moments of perfect pitch-black humour, that pop up every so often, are worth the cost of the boxset alone." From the selection of season four episode of the Volume Four DVD box set, he called "1600 Candles" and "The One That Got Away" as the highlights. Steve Heisler of The A.V. Club generally reacted positively to the majority of American Dad! episodes of the fifth season. He gave the highest grades to the episodes "Delorean Story-an" and "Choosy Wives Choose Smith", which was an 'A'.

Awards and nominations
The fifth season premiere, "1600 Candles", was nominated for a Primetime Emmy Award for Outstanding Animated Program (for Programming Less Than One Hour) in 2009. It competed against Robot Chicken, The Simpsons and South Park at the 61st Primetime Emmy Awards, which was held September 12, 2009. The South Park episode "Margaritaville" ultimately won the award.

See also
 List of American Dad! episodes
American Dad!

References
General
 
Specific

External links

2008 American television seasons
2009 American television seasons